Ancient Macedonians are attested in epigraphy from the 5th century BC throughout classical antiquity. For those recorded in classical literary sources, see list of ancient Macedonians.

Atheno-Macedonian decreesGreek personal names By Elaine Matthews, Simon Hornblower, Peter Marshall Fraser, British Academy pages 99-119

Attica (c. 436 bc)
The names occur also in the second decree below
Aeropos  son of Philippos
Agelaos  son of Alketes
Alketas  son of Alexandros I (and one Alexandros son of Alketes)
Archelas   son of Perdikkas II (Archelaus I of Macedon)
Menelaos   son of Alexandros
Perdikkas  son of Alexandros I (Perdiccas II  the king)

Attica (c. 415 BC)

Adimos  hapax as Adimos, always Adymos 
Alexandros    son of Pantaponos 
Agathon 
Agerros    son of Philippos
Antigenes  
Antiochos   termed as basileus king, presumably of Orestians
Arrabaios   Arrhabaeus the king of Lyncestis
Attakinos  
Autannios 
Bordinos 
Botres 
Boukris  
Byrginos    son of Kraston 
Dadinos  
Derdas 
Dirbeas 
Etharos 
Eulandros 
Eurylochos 
Gaiteas  
Idatas  
Kallias   
Kallimachos  
Kleandros  
Kratennas   
Korrabos  
Korratas  
Lykaios   
Limnaios    
Meleagros  
Misgon  
Neoptolemos  
Nikandros  
Nomenios  
Pausanias   son of Machetas  (Machatas)
Stadmeas

Amphipolis  (352-350 BC)Actes de vente d'Amphipolis
 By Miltiades Chatzopoulos, Page 38 
sale deed of a house

Antipatros  son of Kleinias   seller
Aratos   buyer
Arogomachos   witness
Damon   neighbour
Dionyzios   witness
Dynnichos  neighbour
Garreskios   witness
Hermagoras    priest
Hipottas   guarantor
Laandrichos   seller
Polyainos   witness
Philotas  witness
Spargis  epistates chairman

Kalindoia decree (c. 335 - 305 BC)Macedonian Institutions Under the Kings by Miltiades Chatzopoulos page 151 

Agathanor   son of Agathon  priest
Amerias  son of Kydias 
Antigonos  son of Menandros 
Antimenon   son of Menandros 
Antiphanes  son of Soson 
Glaukias  son of Dabreias 
Gydias   son of Krithon 
Gylis   son of Eurytias 
Harpalos  son of Pha[— — —]
Hegesippos  son of Nikoxenos 
Ikkotas   son of Gyrtos 
Kallias   son of Apollonios 
Kanoun   son of Assa[.]mikos 
Kertimmas   son of Krithon 
Kratippos   son of Eurytias 
Lykourgos  son of Nikanor 
Menelaos   son of Menandros 
Myas     son of Philiskos   or Philistos
Nikanor   son of Nikon  and Nikanor son of Sosos 
Parmenion  son of Al[— — —]
Pason   son of Skythas  
Perdikkas   son of Ammadiskos  
Philagros   son of Menandros 
Philotas    son of Leonidas 
Philoxenos   son of E[— — —]
Ptolemmas   son of M..
Sibras    son of Herodoros 
Troilos    son of Antigonos 
Waddys    or Gaddys  son of Astion

Lete (c. 350 - 300 BC)Macedonian Institutions Under the Kings by Miltiades Chatzopoulos page 151 

Lysandros  son of Amyntas  and
Lyson  son of Pleistiades or Nausiades along with their hetairoi
Adaios  
Agestratos  
Alketas 
Antigonos  
Antiphilos  
Arrabaios  
Attalos   
Attinas  
Demetrios  
Epigonos  
Epikrates  
Epimenes   
Euthymides  
Iollas  
Lysanias  
Menandros  
Polemon  
Ptolemaios  
Sirras  
Sopatros

Curse tablets (4th century BC)

Mygdonia
Diogenes  
Epanaros  
Hosperos   the father of them
Iobiles  
Kriton   
Menon

Pella

Dagina  
Dionysophon  
Makron  
Thetima

Pydna

Agesias  
Aiolos  
Alkimos    
Amdokos  
Amerynkas  
Amyntas  
Amyntichos    
Amyntor   
Antiphila   
Arisstion  
Arybbas  
Asandros  
Boulona  
Chorotimas   
Euboula  
Euippas  
Euphanios  
Euthydikos  
Diognetos  
Dionysios  
Doros  
Galestas  
Harpalos  
Hippias  
Hellan  
Kallias    
Kleandros    
Krateuas   
Ktolemmas   
Kyllis[-]  
Limnaios 
Lokros    
Lynkoritas   
Lysidamos   
Menyllos   
Mikalinos  
Nautas   
Nikandros   
Nikonidas   
Nikolaos      
Nikylla     
Oroidyos   
Pauratas    
Pausanias    
Philan   
Philippos    
Philonychos    
Polemokrates   
Polykasta    
Protocharis   
Simmias    
Sitalkas   
Stratonika  
Tarrias   
Theopropos 
Theutimos   
Thrason   
Timokrates   
Trochas

Parmeniskos group (3rd century BC)
A list of potters

Theorodokoi
Perdiccas, possibly Perdiccas III of Macedon  ~365-311 BC Epidaurian
Pausanias of Kalindoia
Hadymos and Seleukos son of Argaios

Naopoioi
Naopoios (Temple-builder), an elected Archon by Hieromnemones, responsible for restoring the temple of Apollo in Delphi
Philippus 
Timanoridas (son of Cordypion)   ~361-343 BC
Leon (son of Hegesander)  331 BC

Individuals

500 - 400 BC

Aristotima     of Sôsos   Dion c. 400 BC 
Attya         Aiane c. 450-400 BC  
Apakos    owner's signature in inscribed bronze strigil. Aiane c. 500 - 475 BC.
Arkaps        (Arkapos eria, wools of Arkaps)   Aiane  c. 450BC  
Eugeneia     daughter of  Xenon    Pella c. 400 BC    
Kleiona       Aiane c. 500 - 450 BC   
Machatas    owner's inscription, incised after firing.  Attic kylix sherd. Eordaea   early 5th century BC  
Peperias         Aigai early 5th century BC  
Pythagore     of Aristokrates, Aristobole   Pella stoichedon c. 500 - 450  
Theotimos      son of Parmenon   Dion - late 5th century BC  
Xanthos       son of Amadika    and Demetrios  Pella  c. 400 BC   
Xenariste      of Boulagoras. Pella western necropolis c. 400 BC    
Zôbia         Pella epitaph c. 400 BC

400 - 300 BC

Andreas   son of Andrôn    from Osbe.  Beroia epitaph  c. 400–350 BC
Berenika    Lete   c. 350 BC priestess of Demetra, ritually associated with Stratto, Melis and Lysidika
Berennô   of Philistos    Aigai    c. 350 BC  
Bila   of Brateadas      Aigai   c. 350 - 300 BC  
Dexios      from Heraclea (Pieria). Pella c. 400 - 350 BC 
Eurydika  daughter of Sirras. Aigai  c. 350-300 BC  
Harpalos son of Peucolaos c. 350 BC  Aigai  
Phylomaga c. 350-300 BC   Methoni, Pieria c. 350 - 300 BC 
Paton  son of Laandros   Aigai  c. 350-325 BC
Sabattaras  hapax, father of proxenos Machatas  
Sillis    Aigai c. 350 BC   
Zeidymarchis    Pella — 4th/3rd century BC

300-200 BC
Antigonus (son of Callas) hetairos from Amphipolis, commemorates his victory in hoplite racing at Heraclean games after the Conquest of Tyrus.
Ado  termed as Makesta, Maketia (Macedonian woman) pilgrim in Delos 302,296 BC
Attylos  son of Menandros Beroia 4th/3rd century BC   
Chartas   son of Nikanor, hunter Beroia 248 BC
Erginus (son of Simylus) from Cassandreia citharede winner in Soteria (festival)  c. 260 BC
_ _ (son of Callistratus) from Philippi  Dancer winner in Soteria (festival)  ~250  BC
Matero   Bisaltia — Argilos  3rd/2nd century BC

200-100 BC
Bilos   Beroia  2nd century BC 
Biloitos   Beroia  2nd/1st century BC  
Boulomaga    Seleucid or Ptolemaic pilgrim in Delos 185 BC  
Eulaios  father of Lamaga
Lamaga  wife
Laommas  husband
Olympichos   child. Pydna epitaph early 2nd century BC.
Laomaga   daughter of Peritos   Beroia epitaph c. 150 - 100 BC.

References

Macedonians
epigraphy
epigraphy
Greek inscriptions
Old Macedonian kingdom